Courtland High School is a public high school located in Spotsylvania County, Virginia. Founded in 1980, Courtland currently has 1,174 students (2021-2022 school year).

History

Courtland High School was founded in 1980 as Spotsylvania County's second public high school, after Spotsylvania High School. Courtland High school got a new renovation in 2019, this renovation included renewing the office to look more modern and replacing the football field to a new blue field. The renovation also updated the stairwells to improve the look.

Academics 
The school has good academics in terms of preparing students for advanced education. They have a 96% graduation rate and 39% of students participate in AP courses. As for students who go onto have higher education 63% of graduates pursue college or a technical degree.

Students by ethnicity
The diversity of the student population is 59% White, 18% Black, 15% Hispanic, 2% Asian.

Athletics
Courtland has won the following state championships:

 AA Football in 1982, 1983, and 1985. 
 AAA Football in 1987.

 AA field hockey in 2004 and 2005.
 AA Div 4 Men's Basketball in 2009.
 AA Men's Baseball 1995 and 2000.
 Girls' Gymnastics in 1986.
 Girls' Track AA State Champions in 2004 and 2006
 4A Boys' Track & Field Individual State Champions

Notable alumni
Danny McBride
Ryan McBroom: MLB player

References 

Spotsylvania County Public Schools
Public high schools in Virginia
Educational institutions established in 1980
1980 establishments in Virginia